A leadership election was held by the People's Justice Party (PKR) from 29 March 2014 until 10 August 2014. It was won by incumbent President of PKR, Wan Azizah Wan Ismail.

Timeline
 16 February 2014 – Central Executive Committee meeting
 8 March 2014 – Issue of election notice
 29 March 2014 – Nominations open at 10:00 UTC and close at 17:00 UTC
 1 April 2014 – Issue of polling notice
 4 April 2014 – Deadline for making objections to nomination papers
 10 April 2014 – Deadline for withdrawals of nomination
 26 April 2014 – Ballots of members open
 10 August 2014 – Ballots of members close
 20 August 2014 – Results announced

Central Executive Committee election results
Source

President

Deputy President

Vice Presidents

Central Executive Committee Members

References

2014 elections in Malaysia
People's Justice Party leadership election
People's Justice Party leadership elections